Sergey Kobozev (Kostroma, Russian SFSR, Soviet Union; 20 July 1964 – 8 November 1995) was a Russian boxer, who challenged for the WBC Cruiserweight title in 1995. He is also known as a first boxer to defeat John Ruiz. He proved to be a tough slugger, but his career ended early after he was killed by the Russian mafia.

Kobozev was the Cruiserweight Champion of the Soviet Union. After moving to the United States, he continued his undefeated career and became the International Boxing Federation Cruiserweight Champion in July 1994. He was scheduled to fight Orlin Norris on March 12, 1995, for the WBA World Cruiserweight title, but the fight didn't happen. In a bout for the WBC Cruiserweight title on October 24, 1995, he lost his title shot via a split decision. Shortly thereafter he was given another title shot opportunity at a rematch scheduled for December 13 for which he was training, he also had three big matches coming up, but on November 8, 1995, Kobozev was reported missing by his girlfriend Lina Cherskikh. Later surfaced that Kobozev was murdered by Russian mafia after a bar scuffle at Brooklyn's Paradise Club the weekend of November 3, 1995.

Early life
Kobozev had been a captain in the Soviet Army and held a degree in chemistry from the Institute of Moscow, before he made his name as a cruiserweight on the Soviet national boxing team.

Amateur career
As an amateur, Kobozev held wins over Ali Al-Baluchi, Garry Delaney.

Highlights

 Army Championships of the Friendly Armies of the Socialist Countries (heavyweight), Yaroslavl, RSFSR, June 1984:
 (no data available)
 Tammer Tournament (light heavyweight), Tampere, Finland, October 1984:
Finals: Defeated Milan Picka (Czechoslovakia) by decision
 President's Cup (heavyweight), Jakarta, Indonesia, February 1985:
Finals: Defeated Ali Al-Baluchi (Kuwait) RSC 2
 Summer Spartakiad of Peoples of the USSR, boxing (light heavyweight), Moscow, RSFSR, September 1986:
1/2: Defeated Petro Mischenko (Ukrainian SSR)
Finals: Lost to Yuriy Vaulin (Latvian SSR)
 Tammer Tournament (light heavyweight), Tampere, Finland, October 1986:
1/2: Lost to Wolf Preiss (East Germany)
 Army Championships of the Friendly Armies of the Socialist Countries (light heavyweight), Rostov, RSFSR, June 1987:
Finals: Lost to Khakim Matchanov (Uzbek SSR) by split decision, 2–3
 Giraldo Córdova Cardín Tournament (light heavyweight), Las Tunas, Cuba, June–July 1988:
1/8: Defeated Benjamin Luperon (Cuba) by unanimous decision, 5–0
1/4: Defeated Julio Quintana (Cuba) by majority decision, 4–1
1/2: Lost to Pablo Romero (Cuba) by majority decision, 1–4

Strandzha Memorial (light heavyweight), Sofia, Bulgaria, February 1988:
1/4: Lost to Henryk Petrich (Poland) by split decision, 2–3
USA–Soviet Union Middle & Heavy Duals (light heavyweight), Stateline, Nevada, May 1988:
Defeated Joseph Pemberton (United States) RET 2
 Ústí Grand Prix (light heavyweight), Ústí nad Labem, Czechoslovakia, March 1989:
1/4: Defeated Yaha Kosar (Syria) by decision
1/2: Lost to ?
 European Championships (light heavyweight), Athens, Greece, May–June 1989:
1/4: Defeated Alen Kozhukharov (Bulgaria) by unanimous decision, 5–0
1/2: Lost to Sven Lange (East Germany) by unanimous decision, 0–5
 Army Championships of the Friendly Armies of the Socialist Countries (light heavyweight), Sliven, Bulgaria, June 1989:
1/2: Defeated Henryk Petrich (Poland) by walkover
Finals: Lost to Pablo Romero (Cuba) by split decision, 2–3
 Tammer Tournament (light heavyweight), Tampere, Finland, October 1989:
Finals: Defeated Garry Delaney (England) by decision
USA–Soviet Middle & Heavy Duals (light heavyweight), Atlanta, Georgia, November 1989:
Defeated Eugene Gill (United States) RSC

Professional career
In 1990 Kobozev went to the United States, he lived fourth-floor apartment on 16th Street in a working-class section of Sheepshead Bay with his live-in companion Yelena Cherskikh, and her 7-year-old son, Vitaly. He was managed by Thomas Gallagher and trained by Peter Kahn.

He received a shot at the WBC title vacated by recently retired Anaclet Wamba, for which Kobozev fought Marcelo Fabian Dominguez in Paris and lost via a controversial decision.

Early in November 1995 Kobozev started training for a December 13 rematch versus Marcelo Fabian Dominguez to whom he lost a split decision, but soon he disappeared.

Kobozev's ring record was 22 wins and 1 loss in 23 professional outings.

Disappearance
Kobozev disappeared in November 1995, just 2 weeks after losing a close split decision for the WBC Cruiserweight title, his very first career loss.

Murder
The mystery surrounding his death was solved when his bones were found by the FBI in March 1999 in the backyard of the Russian Mafia's #2: Alexander Spitchenko in Livingston, New Jersey, United States where his body was buried in a shallow grave.

Kobozev was allegedly murdered by two reputed Russian mobsters, Alexander Nosov and Vasiliy Ermichine.   Natan Gozman, a third defendant charged in the murder, remained a fugitive until February 2005, when he was arrested in Poland and extradited to New York, where he awaits trial.

Prosecutors said that the Russian mob allegedly turned against Kobozev because he worked as a part-time security guard at a Brooklyn restaurant from which Nosov was ejected after a fight with a musician. Several days after the fight, the defendants and a third member of the gang unexpectedly encountered Kobozev at a car repair shop, where they confronted him about the fight before Nosov shot him, authorities said. Still alive, Kobozev was put in a jeep and driven to the Livingston, N.J., home of a high-ranking member of the crime group, where his neck was broken by Ermichine after Kobozev asked to be taken to a hospital, prosecutors said.

Professional boxing record

|-
|align="center" colspan=8|21 Wins (17 knockouts, 4 decisions), 1 Loss (1 decision), 1 Draw 
|-
| align="center" style="border-style: none none solid solid; background: #e3e3e3"|Result
| align="center" style="border-style: none none solid solid; background: #e3e3e3"|Record
| align="center" style="border-style: none none solid solid; background: #e3e3e3"|Opponent
| align="center" style="border-style: none none solid solid; background: #e3e3e3"|Type
| align="center" style="border-style: none none solid solid; background: #e3e3e3"|Round
| align="center" style="border-style: none none solid solid; background: #e3e3e3"|Date
| align="center" style="border-style: none none solid solid; background: #e3e3e3"|Location
| align="center" style="border-style: none none solid solid; background: #e3e3e3"|Notes
|-
|Loss
|
|align=left| Marcelo Fabian Dominguez
|SD
|12
|24/10/1995
|align=left| Palais Marcel Cerdan, Levallois-Perret, Hauts-de-Seine
|align=left|
|-
|Win
|
|align=left| Art Bayliss
|TKO
|5
|24/06/1995
|align=left| Atlantic City Convention Center, Atlantic City, New Jersey
|align=left|
|-
|Win
|
|align=left| Dale Jackson
|TKO
|2
|29/03/1995
|align=left| Lexington Avenue Armory, New York City
|align=left|
|-
|Win
|
|align=left| Doug "Dig-em-Up" Davis
|TKO
|8
|17/12/1994
|align=left| Trump Taj Majal, Atlantic City, New Jersey
|align=left|
|-
|Win
|
|align=left| "Boxing" Andrew Maynard
|TKO
|10
|27/08/1994
|align=left| Miami Beach Convention Center, Miami Beach, Florida
|align=left|
|-
|Win
|
|align=left| Robert Daniels
|RTD
|8
|30/06/1994
|align=left| Trump Castle, Atlantic City, New Jersey
|align=left|
|-
|Win
|
|align=left| Eddie Curry
|KO
|1
|13/04/1994
|align=left| Raleigh, North Carolina
|align=left|
|-
|Win
|
|align=left| John Ruiz
|SD
|10
|12/08/1993
|align=left| Casino Magic, Bay Saint Louis, Mississippi
|align=left|
|-
|Win
|
|align=left| Danny Wofford
|UD
|8
|21/05/1993
|align=left| Marriott Hotel, Uniondale, New York
|align=left|
|-
|Win
|
|align=left| Ken Jackson
|TKO
|2
|21/03/1993
|align=left| Trump Taj Majal, Atlantic City, New Jersey
|align=left|
|-
|Win
|
|align=left| Kevin "The Monster" Parker
|UD
|6
|24/01/1993
|align=left| Trump Taj Majal, Atlantic City, New Jersey
|align=left|
|-
|Win
|
|align=left| Kelvin Beatty
|TKO
|3
|10/12/1992
|align=left| Trump Taj Majal, Atlantic City, New Jersey
|align=left|
|-
|Win
|
|align=left| Doug "Dig-em-Up" Davis
|TKO
|4
|23/10/1992
|align=left| Fernwood Resort, Bushkill, Pennsylvania
|align=left|
|-
|Win
|
|align=left| Carl Lee Wilson
|TKO
|2
|25/09/1992
|align=left| Friar Tuck Inn, Catskill, New York
|align=left|
|-
|Win
|
|align=left| Dwayne Hall
|TKO
|2
|14/08/1992
|align=left| Trump Plaza Hotel and Casino, Atlantic City, New Jersey
|align=left|
|-
|Win
|
|align=left| Howard "Butch" Kelly
|RTD
|3
|01/07/1992
|align=left| Metropole Night Club, Brooklyn, New York
|align=left|
|-
|Win
|
|align=left| Frank Dupree
|UD
|6
|20/06/1991
|align=left| Aspen Hotel, Parsippany, New Jersey
|align=left|
|-
|Win
|
|align=left| Aleksandr Mitrofanov
|KO
|7
|17/02/1991
|align=left| Grozny, Chechen-Ingush ASSR
|align=left|
|-
|Win
|
|align=left| Rafael Akopov
|KO
|3
|01/12/1990
|align=left| Barnaul, RSFSR
|align=left|
|-
|Win
|
|align=left| Nurmagomed Shanavazov
|KO
|2
|03/11/1990
|align=left| Sport Palace Gornyak, Rudniy, Kazakh SSR
|align=left|
|-
|Draw
|
|align=left| Nurmagomed Shanavazov
|PTS
|8
|30/09/1990
|align=left| Rostov-na-Donu, RSFSR
|align=left|
|-
|Win
|
|align=left| Mikhail Poluyanov
|KO
|2
|02/06/1990
|align=left| Riga, Latvian SSR
|align=left|
|-
|Win
|
|align=left| Andrey Korotaev
|KO
|6
|31/03/1990
|align=left|
|align=left|
|}

References

External links
Village Voice article about Sergei Kobozev
 

1964 births
1995 deaths
Male murder victims
People murdered by Russian-speaking organized crime
Russian people murdered abroad
People murdered in New Jersey
People from Brighton Beach
Russian male boxers
Light-heavyweight boxers
People from Kostroma
Sportspeople from Kostroma Oblast